Joseph P. Mazurek (July 27, 1948 – August 28, 2012) was the 21st Attorney General of Montana and a Montana State Senator from 1981 to 1993.

Early life 
Mazurek was born on July 27, 1948, in San Diego, California. Mazurek's parents were Priscilla and Thomas Mazurek. When he was just nine months old, his parents moved to Helena, Montana. He graduated from Helena High School in 1966, after serving as its student body president.

Education 
In 1970, Mazurek earned a degree from University of Montana. In 1975, Mazurek earned a law degree from University of Montana School of Law.

Career

Military service
Mazurek served in the United States Army for two years between 1970 and 1972. He had the rank of First Lieutenant.

State Senator (1981-1993)
In 1980, Mazurek was elected to the Montana State Senate from the 16th district. In 1984, after redistricting, he was elected to the 23rd district. In 1988 he was re-elected. In 1991 he was appointed to be the president of the Montana State Senate.

Montana Attorney General (1993-2001)
On November 3, 1992, Mazurek was elected Montana Attorney General. He won the race by 13.74 percent against Jack Sands. He was reelected by 21.09 percent four years later, against Larry L. Baer.

2000 Montana Governor Democratic Primary
Mazurek lost in the primary to Mark O'Keefe.

Election history

Personal life
On June 13, 1970, he married his wife Patty. He had three children, Tom, Jeff, and Dan.

Mazurek died on August 28, 2012, at the age of 64.

Legacy 
The Montana Supreme Court building was renamed in his honor as The Joseph P. Mazurek Justice Building.

References

External links
 Attorney Generals of the State of Montana at mtcounties.org via archive.org
 Joseph P. Mazurek at Find a Grave

1948 births
2012 deaths
Montana Attorneys General
Democratic Party Montana state senators
University of Montana alumni